Andrew Reuven Bassat is a co-founder of Seek Limited along with his brother Paul Bassat. Since its inception in September 1997, the company has become the #1 Job seeking portal in Australia.  Bassat remained CEO of SEEK until 2021 (succeeded by Ian Narev), at which point he became CEO of SEEK Investments, a subsidary of SEEK Limited, with a dedicated focus on making new investments and managing and growing SEEK's existing investments. 

Bassat also became president of the St Kilda Football Club in December 2018.

Biography
His father was an IBM executive from Egypt and his mother was born in Poland. 
Bassat attended Brighton Grammar School, and then completed a Bachelor of Science (Computer Science) at the  University of Melbourne, Bachelor of Laws (Honours) from Monash University, and a Master of Business Administration degree Melbourne Business School.

Bassat worked as a solicitor at Corrs Chambers Westgarth and then became a management consultant with Booz Allen & Hamilton.

With his brother Paul, he founded SEEK in 1997 following Paul's bad experience in searching for a home.
 
Bassat was awarded the Australian EY Entrepreneur of the Year in 2013.

References

Living people
Year of birth missing (living people)
Australian chief executives
Australian solicitors
University of Melbourne alumni
Monash Law School alumni
St Kilda Football Club administrators
Australian people of Polish descent
People educated at Brighton Grammar School
Australian people of Egyptian descent